Tom Ormsby Jameson (4 April 1892 – 6 February 1965) was an Irish first-class cricketer. A right-handed batsman and right-arm fast and leg spin bowler, he played just twice for the Ireland cricket team between 1926 and 1928 in first-class matches, but played 124 first-class matches in all, mainly for Hampshire and the MCC.

Biography

Born in County Dublin, Ireland in 1892, Jameson was educated at Harrow School, and played against Eton in the famous Fowler's match in 1910. He made his first-class debut for the MCC against Oxford University in June 1919, making his Hampshire debut the following month against Yorkshire. He played nine more County Championship matches that year, before playing for the South of England against a touring Australian Forces team. He married Joan Musgrave on 11 June 1920.

He played just one County Championship match for Hampshire in 1920, against Surrey in 1920 and also played two first-class matches for the Army, and one for the Combined Services. He played twice for Hampshire in 1921, also playing first-class cricket for the MCC and the Army, in addition to a match for the Combined Services against Australia before rounding out the year with his first Gentlemen v Players match.

His appearances for Hampshire continued to be sporadic throughout 1922, though he continued with first-class cricket for other sides, again playing for the Army, the MCC and the Combined Services, also playing for the Free Foresters and another Gentlemen v Players match. He played many more times for Hampshire in 1923, playing seven County Championship matches, also playing for them against Oxford University and Cambridge University. He again played matches for the MCC and the Army this year, including a match for the MCC against the West Indies.

He did not play at all for Hampshire in 1924, playing solely for the MCC, the Army and for a Combined Services, and that winter was selected for a team captained by Lionel Tennyson for a tour of South Africa. He played ten first-class matches on the tour, including three against the South African national side. His performance on this tour seemed to secure him a more regular place in the Hampshire side in 1925, playing thirteen County Championship matches that year, also playing another Gentlemen v Players match.

He was again selected for a touring side that winter, this time for the MCC side touring the West Indies. He played eleven first-class matches on the tour, including three against the West Indies side. However, he again played little for Hampshire the following summer, playing just three County Championship matches before playing his first match for his native Ireland, against Oxford University in June 1926. He scored 71 in the only Irish innings and took 4/140 when bowling.

He was again selected for an MCC tour that winter, this time to Argentina. He played four first-class matches against the Argentine national team, scoring 100 runs on the tour. He would not play first-class cricket again until May 1928 when he played for the MCC against the West Indies, followed by a County Championship match for Hampshire against Gloucestershire, a match for the MCC against Wales and a match for Ireland against the West Indies, which was his final match for Ireland. He played three more County Championship matches for Hampshire that year.

His career began to wind down in 1929, though he did play seven County Championship matches for Hampshire that year. He played once for the MCC that year, and twice for them in 1930. He played just twice for Hampshire that year, against Middlesex and Australia, and played his final game for Hampshire in 1932, also against Middlesex. He returned to first-class cricket five years later, playing six first-class matches in India for a team captained by Lionel Tennyson. He died in a Dublin Hospital in February 1965.

Statistics

In his two matches for Ireland, Jameson scored 121 runs at an average of 60.50, with a top score of 71 against Oxford University, his only half-century for Ireland. He took nine wickets at an average of 25.78. In all first-class cricket, he scored 4675 runs at an average of 26.56, scoring 5 centuries, with a top score of 133 for SB Joel's XI against Orange Free State. He took 252 wickets at an average of 24.03, taking five wickets in an innings eleven times and ten in a match twice, with best innings bowling figures of 7/92 for Hampshire against Lancashire. His highest score for Hampshire was 105 not out.

Other sports

Jameson was also a fine racquets player, winning the Army singles championship in 1922, 1923 and 1924 and the doubles championship in 1920, 1921 and 1922. He reached the final of the amateur singles championship in 1924 and won the amateur squash championship in 1922 and 1923.

References

1892 births
1965 deaths
Military personnel from County Dublin
Irish cricketers
Hampshire cricketers
Marylebone Cricket Club cricketers
Free Foresters cricketers
Gentlemen cricketers
People educated at Harrow School
People from Dún Laoghaire
Sportspeople from Dún Laoghaire–Rathdown
Sportspeople from Fingal
Rifle Brigade officers
British Army personnel of World War I
British Army cricketers
Combined Services cricketers
North v South cricketers
S. B. Joel's XI cricketers
L. H. Tennyson's XI cricket team